"Can't Wait Another Minute" is a 1986 hit single by British pop group Five Star, peaking at number 7 on the UK Singles Chart and giving them their highest ever peak of 41 on the Billboard Hot 100 in the United States where it also reached number 7 on the Hot R&B chart. The song was written by Paul Chiten (who also did the music track) and Sue Sheridan. It was the lead single from their million-plus selling second album Silk & Steel (which would also include B-side "Don't You Know I Love It").

The song was originally recorded by the female vocal trio Lewis (featuring Dee, Shirley and Linda Lewis, later known as Lewis Sisters), released a month before the Five Star version as the B-side to their single "If the Love Fits". and it was also featured in the 1986 film Gung Ho.

Promotional video
The video features the band making a human clock, with all five members becoming the "hands" of the clock. The band's car also supposedly breaks down, and are late for a concert. The traffic lights change from "Wait" to "Can't Wait" to reflect the song's title.

Track listings

7" vinyl single and 7" posterbag 
 "Can't Wait Another Minute" (Paul Chiten, Sue Sheridan)
 "Don't You Know I Love It" (Doris Pearson)

UK/US 12" vinyl single
 "Can't Wait Another Minute" (Extended Version) – 7:13
 "Can't Wait Another Minute" (Dub Mix) – 4:55
 "Don’t You Know I Love It" – 3:56

US 12" vinyl single
 "Can't Wait Another Minute" (M & M Remix Version) - 8:40
 "Can't Wait Another Minute" (7" Remix Version) - 5:17
 "Can't Wait Another Minute" (M Groove Mix Version) - 5:17
 "Can't Wait Another Minute" (Street Groove Mix Version) - 5:25
 "Can't Wait Another Minute" (Another Minute of Breakdown) - 2:50

All tracks available on the remastered versions of either the 2010 'Silk & Steel' album, the 2013 'The Remix Anthology (The Remixes 1984-1991)' or the 2018 'Luxury - The Definitive Anthology 1984-1991' boxset.

Chart performance

References

1986 singles
1986 songs
Five Star songs
Song recordings produced by Richard James Burgess